Lusitanian mythology is the mythology of the Lusitanians, an Indo-European speaking people of western Iberia, in what was then known as Lusitania and Gallaecia. In present times, the territory comprises most of Portugal, Galicia, Extremadura and a small part of Salamanca.

Lusitanian deities heavily influenced all of the religious practices in western Iberia, including Gallaecia as well. Lusitanian beliefs and practices intermingled with those of Roman deities after Lusitania was conquered. Recently, a Vasconian substrate is starting to be recognized.

Deities

Main pantheon

Through the Gallaecian-Roman inscriptions, a great pantheon of Gallaecian deities begins to emerge, sharing cults with other Celtic or Celticized peoples in the Iberian Peninsula, such as Astur — especially the more Western — or Lusitanian, but also the Gauls and Britons among others. However, because the borders shifted numerous times and Lusitanians and Gallaecians were often referred to as one people, it is relevant to note that some of the so-called Gallaecian or Lusitanian deities had the same names.

Of particular importance and popularity, especially following the Roman conquest, were a number of deities among whom were Endovelicus, Ataegina, Nabia and Trebaruna.

 Bandua or Bandi: their name appears in numerous dedications, mostly to a male deity (exceptionally, female in one), and often linked to a town or a location (e.g., Bandua Roudaeco, Etobrico or Brealiacui). The deity was probably the protector of the local community, often associated with the Roman Mars - possibly as the Gallaecian god of war - and in one dedication is considered a god or goddess of the Vexillum or standard. Appears to have enjoyed great success among the Gallaeci of Braga.
 Berobreus: god of the Otherworld and beyond. The largest shrine dedicated to Berobreo documented until now, stood in the fort of the Torch of Donón (Cangas), in the Morrazo's Peninsula, front of the Cíes Islands.
 Bormanicus: god of hot springs similar to the Gaulish god, Bormanus.

 Nabia: may have been two separate deities, one invoked in tandem with Jupiter, possibly as the consort of the local Lusitanian equivalent; and another identified with Diana, Juno or Victoria (and Roman deities), linked to the protection and defense of the community or health, wealth and fertility. She was also associated with earth and sacred springs, possibly as the deity of water, fountains and rivers. Her name still endures in Galicia and Portugal, such as river Navia, and the Idol Fountain, located in northern Portugal.

 Cossus, warrior god, who attained great popularity among the Southern Gallaeci, was one of the most revered gods in ancient Gallaecia. Several authors suggest that Cosso and Bandua are the same God under different names.
 Reue - Krzysztof Tomasz Witczak suggests he may be the equivalent of the Roman Iovis or Jupiter, both names ultimately deriving from Proto-Indo-European *diewo-. In this lens, he could be considered the supreme god of the pantheon, also dealing with justice and death.
 Lugus, or Lucubo, linked to prosperity, trade and craft occupations. His figure is associated with the spear. It is one of gods most common among the Celts and many, many place names derived from it throughout Europe Celtic Galicia (Galicia Lucus Latinized form) to Loudoun (Scotland), and even the naming of people as Gallaecia Louguei .
 Coventina, goddess of abundance and fertility. Strongly associated with the water nymphs, their cult record for most Western Europe, from England to Gallaecia.
 Endovelicus (Belenus) - taken to have been a god of prophecy and healing, with oracular functions. He appears to have been a minor chthonic god originally, but has become exceptionally popular after Roman colonization.
 Epona was a protector of horses, donkeys, and mules. She was particularly a goddess of fertility, as shown by her attributes of a patera, cornucopia, ears of grain and the presence of foals in some sculptures. She and her horses might also have been leaders of the soul in the after-life ride, with parallels in Rhiannon of the Mabinogion. Unusual for a Celtic deity, most of whom were associated with specific localities, the worship of Epona, "the sole Celtic divinity ultimately worshipped in Rome itself," was widespread in the Roman Empire between the first and third centuries AD.
 Trebaruna appears in inscriptions in the Lusitanian language associated with another, presumably male deity named Reve. 

There is hardly any sign of Bandua, Reue, Arentius-Arentia, Quangeius, Munidis, Trebaruna, Laneana and Nabia — all worshipped in the heart of Lusitania — outside the boundary with the Vettones. Bandua, Reue and Nabia were worshiped in the core area of Lusitania (including Northern Extremadura to Beira Baixa and Northern Lusitania) and reaching inland Galicia, the diffusion of these gods throughout the whole of the northern interior area shows a cultural continuity with Central Lusitania.

Other deities

Two regional deities in Western Iberia do not occur in the region: Crouga, worshiped around Viseu, and Aernus, in the Bragança area. The largest number of indigenous deities found in the whole Iberian Peninsula are located in the Lusitanian-Galician regions, and models proposing a fragmented and disorganized pantheon have been discarded, since the number of deities occurring together is similar to those of other Celtic peoples in Europe and ancient civilizations.

A sun goddess, Kontebria (Cantabria), was apparently present, her worship later being assimilated into Virgin Mary's Nossa Senhora de Antime figure.

Dii, Lares, Nymphs and Genii were the main types of divinity worshiped, known from the Latin epigraphy, although many names are recorded in the Lusitanian or Celtiberian languages.

See also
 Castro culture
 Celtic mythology
 Enchanted Moura
 Etruscan mythology
 Germanic mythology
 Mare (folklore)
 Greek mythology
 List of deities
 Lusitanian language
 National Archaeology Museum (Portugal)
 Ophiussa
 Pre-Roman peoples of the Iberian Peninsula
 Proto-Indo-European mythology
 Roman mythology

References
Notes

Sources

Further reading

 .
 
 .
 .
 .
 Redentor, Armando (2008). “Panorama da Teonímia Pré-romana em Trás-os-montes Oriental”. In: Divindades indígenas em análise. Coord. José d’ Encarnação. Coimbra e Porto: Centro de Estudos Arqueológicos, Universidade de Coimbra, Universidade do Porto, pp. 105-124.

External links 
 Religiões da Lusitânia (in Portuguese)
 Panteão da Lusitânia (in Portuguese)
 Detailed map of the Pre-Roman Peoples of Iberia (around 200 BC)